Harold Nelson Bornstein (March 26, 1947 – January 8, 2021) was an American gastroenterologist, who was best known as Donald Trump's personal physician. Bornstein was Donald Trump's personal physician from 1980 until early 2018; before then Bornstein's father was his personal physician.

Education 
Bornstein received his M.D. degree from Tufts University in 1975 and had been licensed to practice medicine in New York State since 1976. He was certified by the American Board of Internal Medicine as a specialist in Internal Medicine (1978) and Gastroenterology (1983).

Trump's personal physician role 
In December 2015 in response to questions about his health, Trump asked Bornstein to issue a "full medical report", predicting that it would show "perfection". Two days later Bornstein signed a letter full of superlatives, saying that Trump's "laboratory results are astonishingly excellent" and that Trump "will be the healthiest individual ever elected to the presidency." In August 2016, Bornstein stated that he had written the letter in five minutes while Trump's limousine waited for it. But he reiterated that Trump's "health is excellent, especially his mental health."

In May 2018 Bornstein said that, in fact, Trump had dictated the letter over the telephone, then sent a car to pick it up. Bornstein said in an interview with CNN that "Mr. Trump dictated the letter and I would tell him what he couldn't put in there..."

Speaking to The New York Times in February 2017, Bornstein revealed that he was invited to and attended President Trump's inauguration with his wife Melissa. Bornstein told The Times that he enjoyed the attention from being known as the President's personal physician. According to Stat, Bornstein had hoped to be the physician to the President, but the White House decided that Ronny Jackson would continue in that role.

On May 1, 2018, Bornstein told NBC News that three Trump representatives had "raided" his office on February 3, 2017, taking all of Trump's medical records. He identified two of the men as Trump's longtime bodyguard Keith Schiller and the Trump Organization's chief legal officer Alan Garten. Two days earlier, Bornstein had told a reporter that Trump took a prescription hair growth medicine, Propecia, after which Trump cut ties with him.

Death
Bornstein died in January 2021. The place and cause of death was not disclosed.

References

1947 births
2021 deaths
21st-century American physicians
American gastroenterologists
Tufts University School of Medicine alumni
Physicians from New York City
American people of Jewish descent